Mount Rotolante is a mountain in the Queen Alexandra Range with a peak  above sea level. Situated 6 nautical miles (11 km) northwest of Mount Fox, it was named by the Advisory Committee on Antarctic Names (US-ACAN) after Ralph A. Rotolante, a United States Antarctic Research Program (USARP) meteorologist at McMurdo Station, 1962.

References

Mountains of the Ross Dependency
Shackleton Coast